Eltingville is a neighborhood in the Staten Island borough of New York City, United States. It is located on Staten Island's South Shore, immediately to the south of Great Kills and north of Annadale. The main commercial area of Eltingville extends down Richmond Avenue, with offshoots heading north on Amboy Road and Hylan Boulevard. Eltingville is represented in the New York State Senate by Andrew Lanza, in the New York State Assembly by Michael Reilly, and in the New York City Council by Joe Borelli.

History
Originally called South Side, and later Seaside, the neighborhood owes its present name to a prominent family by the name of Elting which settled there in the early 19th century. It was the southern terminus of the Staten Island Railway until 1860, when the line was extended to Tottenville.  The community's main business district sprang up around the railroad station, which is located a short distance north of the intersection of Amboy Road and Richmond Avenue.

It is probably with the neighborhoods of Eltingville and Great Kills in mind that New York Telephone named a telephone exchange "Honeywood" in the 1920s; this exchange, which also served Annadale and Huguenot, was retired from service in 1959, but a local business establishment—Honeywood Liquors on Hylan Boulevard—remained for decades as a reminder of the exchange's existence.  When Honeywood 6 and nearby Tottenville 8, with operators connecting all calls, converted to dial service the combined exchanges became YUkon 4. Today, in addition to 984, the Verizon telephone exchange numbers include 356 (formerly FL6), 226, 227, 317, 948, 966, and 967. The 605 and 608 exchanges were added in 1998 and 1999, respectively.

In the early 20th century, Eltingville was settled primarily by Scandinavians, mostly Norwegians, to the point that unrelated families in the neighborhood often shared identical surnames, including Hansen, Johnson, Erickson, Ronning, Nygren, Bundesen and Swanson. These names were so common that people in Eltingville would differentiate between families by appending their trade or other defining characteristics with nicknames, such as "delicatessen Hansen", "fish Hansen", "two-family" Hansen. A granddaughter of one of these Eltingville families is model Patti Hansen, wife of Rolling Stones guitarist Keith Richards.

The Scandinavian influence in Eltingville meant one could buy herring in wooden barrels which would be taken home and pickled. The Eltingville Lutheran Church was founded by Norwegians, including Henry W. Erickson, who was a charter member of the congregation and the contractor who built the church, and the church served as a thriving support base for the community. Many of the older homes built in Eltingville, and other parts of the South Shore, were built by Scandinavian carpenters, including Henry W. Erickson, and another prominent builder, Ernst Nilsson, who emigrated from Sweden at the age of 12 and became a millionaire in house construction in southern Staten Island. Many of these homes have since been demolished and continue to be torn down, and little is documented about the contributions of the Scandinavian immigrants that built them.

Optimo Cigar, a once popular cigar store chain found across New York City, originated from the store founded in Eltingville by a Norwegian man, Paul Alan Moe. For many years, Optimo Cigar was located next to the Eltingville train station. The store closed in the 1990s, although two fluted, Greek-style columns from the storefront remain as a reminder.

After the Verrazzano-Narrows Bridge opened in 1964, Eltingville was the scene of massive new home construction as part of the suburbanization of New York City. Like many other Staten Island neighborhoods, the farmland that had predominated the area was developed, and the once rural area became part of the city conurbation. This initially caused logistical problems, chiefly a lack of sewer lines, which then needed to be built. As a result, local traffic frequently had to be detoured from many main thoroughfares, including a large section of Hylan Boulevard during the 1990s.

Eltingville today has a large Italian-American population, like most of the south shore of Staten Island, with many Italian-owned businesses, including Giovanni's Ristorante, John Vincent Scalia Funeral Home, Portobello Cafe, Freddie's Pork Store and Salumeria, Sure Electrical Contracting, Carlo's Fish Market, DeRosa & Sons, Pastosa Ravioli, and a large number of pizzerias. The office of State Senator Andrew Lanza is also located on Richmond Avenue in the neighborhood. Eltingville is home to a smaller number of Irish-Americans, as well as a growing population of Russians and other minority ethnic groups.

St. Alban's Episcopal Church was listed on the National Register of Historic Places in 1982.

Education
Eltingville is home to many schools, including P.S. 42 and Eltingville Lutheran School, both of which send students to I.S.7 for middle school.

Transportation
Eltingville is served by the  local buses. It is also served by the Staten Island Railway at the Eltingville station, and the  express buses, many of which terminate at the Eltingville Transit Center.

Notable residents
Evan Dorkin, comic book creator, worked at Jim Hanley's Universe, a comic book store in Eltingville, off and on for six years. His comic book series The Eltingville Club, which was adapted into an animated pilot for Adult Swim, is set in the neighborhood.
Vito Fossella, politician, campaign headquarters was in Eltingville.
Steven Seagal, actor, once lived in Eltingville.

References

 
Neighborhoods in Staten Island
Little Italys in the United States
Populated coastal places in New York (state)
1873 establishments in New York (state)
Populated places established in 1873